Epectasis is a genus of longhorn beetles of the subfamily Lamiinae, containing the following species:

 Epectasis hiekei Breuning, 1974
 Epectasis juncea (Newman, 1840)
 Epectasis junceoides Breuning, 1961 
 Epectasis mexicana Breuning, 1954
 Epectasis panamensis Breuning, 1974
 Epectasis rotundipennis Breuning, 1943
 Epectasis similis Gahan, 1895

References

Pteropliini